The Ministry of Public Enterprises (MPE) was a department of the Namibian government. It was established in 2015 and existed in this form until 2022. The only minister in this ministry was Leon Jooste.

The ministry was set up to manage 18 profit-driven state-owned enterprises in Namibia.

In 2021, the ministry began its transformation into a department, in Namibia the sub-ministerial entity, of the Ministry of Finance. For the state-owned companies, a holding company is to be created, a process estimated to take 5 years. Minister Jooste resigned from his position on 31 March 2022. Because he intended to return to the private sector he also vacated his cabinet and parliament seats, as well as his position on the SWAPO central committee.

References

External links
Official website Ministry of Public Enterprises

Public enterprises
Public enterprises
Government-owned companies of Namibia
Economy of Namibia
2015 establishments in Namibia
2022 disestablishments in Namibia